Terry Wayne Wilshusen (March 22, 1949 – December 1, 2000) was a professional baseball pitcher. He attended Carson High School (Carson, California) then Los Angeles City College where he was selected in the 8th round of the 1968 secondary phase draft by the Detroit Tigers. He appeared in one game in Major League Baseball for the California Angels on April 7 during the 1973 California Angels season. He faced four batters, walking two and hitting one while getting just one out. All three of the batters who reached base scored, leaving Wilshusen with a career ERA of 81.00.

In 1969, Wilshusen set a California League record by recording 21 saves for the Stockton Ports. That record stood until 1982.

In 1989, Wilshusen pitched for the Orlando Juice of the Senior Professional Baseball Association.

References

External links

Major League Baseball pitchers
California Angels players
Stockton Ports players
Dallas–Fort Worth Spurs players
Rochester Red Wings players
Salt Lake City Angels players
Indianapolis Indians players
Baseball players from California
1949 births
2000 deaths
People from Atascadero, California
People from Lomita, California
Carson High School (Carson, California) alumni
Orlando Juice players
Los Angeles City Cubs baseball players